The 1988 Nebraska Cornhuskers football team represented the University of Nebraska–Lincoln in the 1988 NCAA Division I-A football season. The team was coached by Tom Osborne and played their home games in Memorial Stadium in Lincoln, Nebraska.

Schedule

Roster and coaching staff

Depth chart

Game summaries

Texas A&M

Utah State

at UCLA

Arizona State

UNLV

at Kansas

Oklahoma State

at Kansas State

Missouri

at Iowa State

Colorado

at Oklahoma

Orange Bowl (vs Miami (FL))

Rankings

Awards

NFL and pro players
The following Nebraska players who participated in the 1988 season later moved on to the next level and joined a professional or semi-pro team as draftees or free agents.

References

Nebraska
Nebraska Cornhuskers football seasons
Big Eight Conference football champion seasons
Nebraska Cornhuskers football